Bernard Rackham  (26 July 1876, Lambeth, London – 13 February 1964, Liss, Hampshire) was an English writer and lecturer on ceramics and stained glass and spent his career as a curator at the Victoria and Albert Museum. He is known for his pioneering research on Italian maiolica.

Education and career
Bernard Rackham matriculated in October 1895 at Pembroke College, Cambridge, graduating there B.A. 1898 and M.A. 1907. At the Ceramics Department of the Victoria and Albert Museum he was from 1898 to 1924 an Assistant and from 1924 to 1938 a Keeper. As a curator, he acquired Chinese ceramics, works by Reginald Wells, and works by William Staite Murray, the latter works as the gift of George Eumorfopoulos. Rackham contributed over 50 articles to The Burlington Magazine and wrote one section of the article on ceramics for the 1911 Encyclopædia Britannica.

In 1937, he was appointed a Companion of the Order of the Bath (CB). The Cardiff Metropolitan University Library has the Rackham Collection of over 70 books written or edited by Bernard Rackham, together with books from his personal collection and associated objects donated by the Rackham family.

Family
Bernard Rackham married in 1909. One of 12 children, Bernard Rackham was a brother of the famous illustrator Arthur Rackham and a brother of Harris Rackham, who was a lecturer in classics at Cambridge and the husband of the social reformer Clara Rackham. Another brother, Maurice Rackham (1879–1927), was killed by an avalanche at Zürs.

Selected publications

with Herbert Read: 
with Robert Lockhart Hobson and William King:

References

External links
 

1876 births
1964 deaths
British art curators
Alumni of Pembroke College, Cambridge
Companions of the Order of the Bath